Love Is a Gentle Thing is an album by Harry Belafonte, released by RCA Victor in 1959. It was recorded with arranger / conductors Alan Greene and Bob Corman.

Billboard magazine chose Love Is a Gentle Thing as one of their "Spotlight Winners of the Week" in March 1959, and wrote that "Belafonte displays his usual tender, feelingful vocal style on a group of expressive folk themes with varying moods...Striking cover".

Track listing

Side one
 "Fifteen" – 2:50
 "I Never Will Marry" – 2:44
 "I'm Goin' Away" – 3:08
 "Small One" – 2:53
 "Bella Rosa" – 3:25
 "All My Trials" – 4:37

Side two
 "Green Grow the Lilacs" – 3:55
 "Times are Gettin' Hard" – 3:36
 "Turn Around" – 2:23
 "Go Away from My Window" – 3:09
 "Delia's Gone" – 4:34
 "Walkin' on the Green Grass" – 3:22

Personnel
Harry Belafonte – vocals
Bob Corman – arranger, conductor ("I Never Will Marry", "Bella Rosa", "All My Trials", "Green Grow the Lilacs", "Times are Gettin' Hard", "Delia's Gone", "Walkin' on the Green Grass")
Alan Greene  – arranger, conductor ("Fifteen", "I'm Goin' Away", "Small One", "Turn Around", "Go Away From My Window")
Produced by Edward Welker
Cover Art by David Stone Martin
Liner-notes by Paul Ackerman

References

1959 albums
Harry Belafonte albums
RCA Victor albums
Albums with cover art by David Stone Martin
Albums conducted by Robert De Cormier
Albums arranged by Robert De Cormier